Peter Nicholas Lee (born 21 November 1943) is an English chess player who won the British Chess Championship in 1965. Born in London and educated at Exeter College, Oxford, he represented Oxford University in the Varsity chess matches of 1963, 1964, 1965, and 1966, and represented England in the Chess Olympiads of 1966, 1968, and 1970.

Later, he turned to contract bridge, at which he has also been highly successful. He has won the English Bridge Union's National Pairs title four times, the first time in 2003, and has also been a member of the team that won the Gold Cup, the premier teams event in Britain, in 2003 and 2011.  This makes him the only person who has won British championships in both chess and bridge.

As a consultant in medical statistics and epidemiology, he has also published over 200 papers, many on the effects of tobacco on health.

References

External links
 
 

1943 births
Living people
Alumni of Exeter College, Oxford
British statisticians
Chess players from London
British and Irish contract bridge players
English contract bridge players
Bridge players from London